Bungasan is a village in Indonesia, in the southeast of the Wonosobo Regency. It is located in the desa Tanjunganom, kecamatan Kepil at the foot of Sumbing, and surrounded by sugarcane plantations.

Villages in Central Java